Shiloh is an unincorporated community in southern Cass Township, Sullivan County, in the U.S. state of Indiana.

The community is part of the Terre Haute Metropolitan Statistical Area.

History
The community was likely named after the biblical city of Shiloh.

Geography

Notable residents
Arcturus Z. Conrad, author, pastor, theologian

References

Unincorporated communities in Sullivan County, Indiana
Unincorporated communities in Indiana
Terre Haute metropolitan area